Lukyanivska may refer to:
 Lukianivska (Kiev Metro)
 Lukyanivska Prison
 Lukianivska (street)

See also
Lukyanivka (disambiguation)